San Pietro Avellana is a comune (municipality) in the Province of Isernia in the Italian region of Molise, about  northwest of Campobasso and some  north of Isernia.

History
In 1026, Dominic of Sora established the monastery of San Pietro Avellano, at the instigation of Count Oderisio Borello, and a village began to form nearby. In 1069, the monastery was ceded to Monte Cassino. The abbots fortified the village to stop its plundering by local counts. The abbey at San Pietro Avellano was abandoned after a devastating earthquake in 1441, but the village remained an ecclesiastical dependency of Monte Cassino until 1785.

The municipality of San Pietro Avellana contains the frazione (subdivision) Masserie di Cristo. San Pietro Avellana borders municipalities Ateleta, Capracotta, Castel del Giudice, Castel di Sangro, Roccaraso and Vastogirardi.

Many descendants of the original San Pietro Avellana, a village with a population well over 2,000, live in the Cleveland, Pittsburgh, and Youngstown areas in the United States. They have spread out all across the globe, from Rock Springs, Wyoming, to Argentina, to northern New Jersey, and back to northern Italy's Industrial Triangle. In 1906 a new shrine to Saint Amico was constructed through donations from former residents who had emigrated from San Pietro Avellano.

Saint Amico
The patron saint of San Pietro Avellana is a saint whose remains rest on hillside in the woods, overlooking the village where he worked. In local dialect, or dialetto sampietrese, Saint Amico is called Sand'Amig.

Two vitae are published in the Ata Sanctorum. He came of a good family of the neighborhood of Camerino, and was a secular priest in that town. Then he became a hermit and afterwards a monk, his example inducing, it is said, his father and mother, brothers and nephews also to embrace the religious life. But St Amicus found the discipline of his monastery insufficiently austere, and he again became a solitary, this time in the Abruzzi. He lived here completely alone for three years, when disciples began to gather round him. On one occasion he miraculously relieved a famine".

The last years of his life were passed at the monastery at San Pietro Avellano, where he died around 1045.

The shrine of Sant'Amico is referred to as Il Bosco di Sant'Amico.
  
This Amico should not be confused with the Cistercian Saint Amico of the Abbey of Santa Maria Rambona in the province of Macerata.

Sport
San Pietro Avellana has a soccer team called "ASD San Pietro Avellana."

Population change

References

External links
 www.comune.sanpietroavellana.is.it/
 St Amico Website

Cities and towns in Molise